The Green Line Express is a passenger train operated daily by Pakistan Railways between Karachi and Islamabad. It is the flagship rail of the organization and has the highest passage priority. It was inaugurated by Mian Muhammad Nawaz Sharif on 15 May 2015 at Islamabad railway station.

Route
 Karachi Cantonment–Islamabad via Karachi–Peshawar Railway Line

Station stops
 Karachi Cantonment
 Hyderabad Junction
 Rohri Junction
 Bahawalpur
 Khanewal Junction
 Lahore Junction
 Rawalpindi
 Islamabad

Coaches
The train has 2 parlor cars, 5 AC Business coaches, 6 AC standard coaches, and four to five economy coaches.

Suspension
In the wake of the 2022 Pakistan Floods, the train's operations has been suspended since 27 August 2022, With the floodwater receding and rehabilitation of effected train tracks completing, Pakistan Railway announced to resume Green Line's operations in December 2022.

Upgradation
On 28 November 2022, 46 high-speed coaches were delivered to Pakistan Railway by China Railway Construction Corporation as per the agreement signed in 2021. After testing, these modern coaches will be employed first in the Green Line Express.

References

Named passenger trains of Pakistan
Passenger trains in Pakistan